Gamekings is a Dutch television program centered on videogames and is broadcast on Comedy Central in The Netherlands. Until 2005 it was broadcast on the former Dutch television channel The Box, until 2011 on TMF and until 2014 on MTV. Since then they have moved to SpikeTV and are now working under their own Label Blammo  Media, additionally being sponsored by Fans with their 'Gamekings Premium' service.

In the program the presenters give their opinion about new videogames, but you see them living the "gamer life" as well. The program was named the equivalent of 'Top Gear' for games by Nieuwe Revu Magazine.

References 

Dutch television talk shows